In number theory, a balanced prime is a prime number with equal-sized prime gaps above and below it, so that it is equal to the arithmetic mean of the nearest primes above and below. Or to put it algebraically, given a prime number , where  is its index in the ordered set of prime numbers,

For example, 53 is the sixteenth prime; the fifteenth and seventeenth primes, 47 and 59, add up to 106, and half of that is 53; thus 53 is a balanced prime.

Examples
The first few balanced primes are

5, 53, 157, 173, 211, 257, 263, 373, 563, 593, 607, 653, 733, 947, 977, 1103, 1123, 1187, 1223, 1367, 1511, 1747, 1753, 1907, 2287, 2417, 2677, 2903 .

Infinitude

It is conjectured that there are infinitely many balanced primes.

Three consecutive primes in arithmetic progression is sometimes called a CPAP-3. A balanced prime is by definition the second prime in a CPAP-3.  the largest known CPAP-3 has 15004 digits and was found by Serge Batalov. It is:

The value of n (its rank in the sequence of all primes) is not known.

Generalization
The balanced primes may be generalized to the balanced primes of order n. A balanced prime of order n is a prime number that is equal to the arithmetic mean of the nearest n primes above and below. Algebraically, given a prime number , where k is its index in the ordered set of prime numbers,

Thus, an ordinary balanced prime is a balanced prime of order 1.

See also
Strong prime, a prime that is greater than the arithmetic mean of its two neighboring primes
Interprime, a composite number balanced between two prime neighbours

References

Classes of prime numbers
Unsolved problems in number theory